Kickert is a surname. Notable people with the surname include:

 Daniel Kickert (born 1983), Australian basketball player
 Jan Kickert (born 1964), Austrian Permanent Representative to the United Nations
 Walter Kickert (born 1950), Dutch academic, and Professor of Public Management

See also
 Kickett